Coleophora scabrida is a moth of the family Coleophoridae. It is found from Sweden to Spain and Italy and from France to southern Russia.

The wingspan of the moth is 12–14 mm. Adults are on wing in June and July.

The larvae feed on Herniaria glabra. They create a light grey, trivalved, tubular silken case of about 7 mm with a mouth angle of about 45°, sprinkled with sand grains.

References

scabrida
Moths of Europe
Moths described in 1959